Bolshiye Karkaly (Olo Kärkäle) is a rural locality (a selo) and the administrative centre of Bolshekarkalinksy Selsoviet, Miyakinsky District, Bashkortostan, Russia. The population was 488 as of 2010. There are 6 streets.

Geography 
Bolshiye Karkaly is located 29 km southeast of Kirgiz-Miyaki (the district's administrative centre) by road. Kamyshly is the nearest rural locality.

References 

Rural localities in Miyakinsky District